Michael W. Carroll is an astronomical artist and science writer.  His art has appeared in magazines such as TIME, National Geographic, and Astronomy, and has flown aboard the Russian space station Mir and NASA's Phoenix Mars lander. He is also a founding member of the International Association of Astronomical Artists.

Career
Carroll has written over 30 children's and adult books on subjects ranging from space to paleontology, including a Christian book series for children. He has been commissioned by NASA, the Jet Propulsion Laboratory, and the Planetary Society. Carroll was staff artist for the Reuben Fleet Space Theater, one of the world's largest planetariums and OMNIMAX theatres in San Diego.

International Association of Astronomical Artists
In 1981 a group of astronomical artists met in a space art show sponsored by the Planetary Society for the Society's Planetfest, held during the live transmission of close-up photos of Saturn by Voyager II. Carroll was curator of the exhibition. Artists in attendance organized several successive annual workshops; Carroll organized the second, held in Death Valley, California towards the end of 1983. With a rapidly growing membership, the IAAA (International Association of Astronomical Artists) was formally registered as an association of astronomical artists in 1986.

He was one of seven North American space artists invited by the Space Research Institute of the former USSR to attend the Space Future Forum in Moscow in 1987, where he consulted with Soviet scientists and artists. While there, he helped to establish the Dialogues project, a series of workshops and exhibitions involving Soviet, American and European artists. One of his digitized paintings was aboard Russia¹s doomed Mars 96 mission, an original flew aboard Mir, and a third is on the surface of Mars, in digital form, aboard the Phoenix Lander.

Awards
Carroll is the recipient of the 2006 Lucien Rudaux Memorial Award for lifetime achievement in the astronomical arts.

In 2012, he received the American Astronomical Society Division for Planetary Sciences's Jonathan Eberhart Planetary Sciences Journalism Award. In 2017, he received a Congressional Medal for his participation in an expedition to Antarctica's Mount Erebus.

Bibliography

Books
 
 
 
 
 
 
 
Antarctica: Earth's Own Ice World. Praxis. 2018. 
Lords of the Ice Moons: A Scientific Novel. Springer. 2019.

Articles

References

External links
Michael Carroll bio at official website
 - Summary bibliography
Podcast of Planetary Radio's "Drifting on Alien Winds"
A Black Hole is NOT a Hole, a children's book illustrated by Michael Carroll (Charlesbridge Publishing, 2012); a few of Carroll's images are on the page.
Big Bang! The Tongue-Tickling Tale of a Speck that Became Spectacular, an International Reading Association Notable children's book illustrated by Michael Carroll (Charlesbridge Publishing, 2005)

American artists
Analog Science Fiction and Fact people
Space artists
Living people
Year of birth missing (living people)